Carlton Bank is a hill in the Cleveland Hills, in north-east England. It is located on Carlton Moor in the North York Moors and overlooks the villages of Carlton-in-Cleveland and Faceby. The summit provides extensive views of Teesside including Middlesbrough and Redcar to the north as well as the surrounding moorland. Roseberry Topping can also be clearly seen from the summit in a north-easterly direction. The Cleveland Way National Trail crosses Carlton Bank and is part of Wainwright's Coast to Coast Walk.

Gallery

Mountains and hills of North Yorkshire
North York Moors